Sidney Herold Lazard (December 18, 1930 – November 3, 2015) was an American business leader in the oil and gas industries and a champion contract bridge player. He attended Tulane University and was a lifelong New Orleans resident until 2001, when he moved to Dallas, Texas.

Lazard was inducted into the ACBL Hall of Fame in 2000.

Sidney H. Lazard, Jr. Sportsmanship Award
In 2001, Lazard established the Sidney H. Lazard, Jr. Sportsmanship Award in honor of his son, who died in 1999 after battling cancer. The annual award celebrates sportsmanlike characteristics and aims to recognize those who "play hard but fair and hold no grudges."

The 2016 recipient was Boye Brogeland.

Bridge accomplishments

Honors

 ACBL Hall of Fame, 2000

Wins

 North American Bridge Championships (14)
 Blue Ribbon Pairs (1) 2002 
 North American Pairs (1) 1990 
 Vanderbilt (1) 1970 
 Mitchell Board-a-Match Teams (1) 1977 
 Chicago Mixed Board-a-Match (5) 1963, 1977, 1978, 1979, 1982 
 Reisinger (2) 1960, 1997 
 Spingold (3) 1954, 1958, 1968

Runners-up

 North American Bridge Championships
 Rockwell Mixed Pairs (1) 1959 
 Wernher Open Pairs (2) 1967, 1997 
 Nail Life Master Open Pairs (1) 2001 
 Open Pairs (1928-1962) (1) 1957 
 Grand National Teams (2) 1987, 2004 
 Jacoby Open Swiss Teams (1) 1983 
 Vanderbilt (2) 1967, 1994 
 Mitchell Board-a-Match Teams (4) 1954, 1956, 1961, 1965 
 Chicago Mixed Board-a-Match (1) 1961 
 Reisinger (3) 1968, 1969, 1975 
 Spingold (2) 1966, 1973

References

External links
  – with video interview

1930 births
American contract bridge players
People from New Orleans
2015 deaths
Place of birth missing